The Seagull is a 2018 American historical drama film directed by Michael Mayer with a screenplay by Stephen Karam, based on the 1896 play of the same name by Anton Chekhov. The film stars Annette Bening, Saoirse Ronan, Corey Stoll, Elisabeth Moss, Mare Winningham, Jon Tenney, Glenn Fleshler, Michael Zegen, Billy Howle and Brian Dennehy. Filming began in June 2015 in New York City and the world premiere took place  at the Tribeca Film Festival on April 21, 2018, prior to general release on May 11, 2018, through  Sony Pictures Classics.

Synopsis
Set in Russia in the early 1900s, an aging actress named Irina Arkadina pays summer visits to her brother Pjotr Nikolayevich Sorin and her son Konstantin at a country estate. On one occasion, she brings her lover Boris Trigorin, a successful novelist. Nina, a free and innocent girl on a neighboring estate, who is in a relationship with Konstantin, falls in love with Boris.

Cast
 Annette Bening as Irina Arkadina, an actress. Mother to Konstantin and lover of Boris.
 Saoirse Ronan as Nina Zarechnaya, young actress and lover of Konstantin.
 Corey Stoll as Boris Trigorin, a successful author and Irina's lover.
 Elisabeth Moss as Masha, daughter of Polina and Shamrayev.
 Mare Winningham as Polina, wife to Shamrayev.
 Jon Tenney as Dr. Sergeyevich Dorn
 Glenn Fleshler as Shamrayev, father of Masha and husband to Polina.
 Michael Zegen as Mikhail Medvedenko, a young schoolteacher in love with Masha.
 Billy Howle as Konstantin Treplyov, a playwright in a tumultuous relationship with Nina.
 Brian Dennehy as Sorin Arkadin, Irina's aging brother.

Production
On May 13, 2015, it was announced that Michael Mayer would direct the adaptation of Anton Chekhov's play The Seagull, scripted by Stephen Karam. Saoirse Ronan and Annette Bening would star along with Corey Stoll and Billy Howle. Producers are Leslie Urdang, Tom Hulce and Robert Salerno.

Filming began on June 29, 2015, in New York City, with much of the film shot on location at Arrow Park in Monroe, NY.

Release
In October 2017, Sony Pictures Classics acquired distribution rights to the film. The film had its world premiere at the Tribeca Film Festival on April 21, 2018. It was released on May 11, 2018.

Critical response
The website's critical consensus reads, "The latest iteration of The Seagull does little to distinguish itself from other Chekhov adaptations but provides a pleasing showcase for its sterling cast." On Metacritic, the film has a weighted average score of 58 out of 100, based on 31 critics, indicating "mixed or average reviews".

A.O. Scott reviewing the film for The New York Times found the cast for the film to be very well selected for their roles but the film as a whole to be disappointing stating: "Ms. Bening, Ms. Moss and Ms. Ronan in particular are superb, as you also probably didn’t need me to tell you. Each one finds the individuality that Chekhov, with uncanny sympathy and sly gallantry, imparted to his female characters. The cast is great. The play is great. But this is still a bad movie, because it has no clear or coherent idea of how to be one".

References

External links
 

2018 films
2018 drama films
2010s American films
2010s English-language films
American drama films
American films based on plays
Films based on plays by Anton Chekhov
Films directed by Michael Mayer
Films scored by Nico Muhly
Films scored by Anton Sanko
Films set in Russia
Films shot in New York City
Films with screenplays by Stephen Karam
Sony Pictures Classics films